Breeding Ground were a Canadian alternative rock band in the 1980s, based out of Toronto, Ontario, Canada. Lead singer John Shirreff and guitarist Hugh Gladish were the only consistent members of the band, and they founded the group in 1981 with original bassist Jonathan Strayer.

History

Formation
Breeding Ground were created in 1981 by vocalist Shirreff, guitarist Gladish, and bassist Strayer. Breeding Ground played over 40 shows on the Queen Street West circuit before they released their first eponymous debut EP, Breeding Ground, on Mannequin Records, recorded at Montclair Sound in November 1982, with original drummer Ken Jones. This was produced by Paul Tozer, their live audio technician, who worked with them on their first two EPs.  Within a month of its release they were asked to open up for Bauhaus on December 4, 1982 at Larry's Hideaway in Toronto. Comparisons to Joy Division and the British cold-wave invasion were quick to surface after this release. They were managed by longtime friend David Hart (who also masterminded and operated the stage lighting) during this era. Breeding Ground also played at Lee's Palace in Toronto in 1986.

Within a little over a year, they had returned to the studio with this line-up to record "Reunion/Slaughter", their second 12" single. Jonathan Davies, the drummer for local band Kinetic Ideals, expressed an interest in assisting with production, and 3 months before the release replaced Jones in the live line-up. This EP was recorded at Quest Studio, Oshawa, and released in October 1983. "Reunion/Slaughter" was playlisted on Toronto radio station CFNY and again on college stations across Canada.

Davies was later replaced by Kevin Hunter, who would stay with the band until their break-up in 1990.

Studio albums
Three years after releasing "Reunion/Slaughter", the band returned to the studio in the late winter of 1985 to record their third release, with label Fringe Product. This album, Tales of Adventure, was released April 25, 1986, and spawned the hits "This Time Tomorrow" and "Happy Now I Know" featuring Molly Johnson. Videos were produced for these songs, both directed and produced by Jonathan Strayer's younger brother Colin Strayer; the video for "This Time Tomorrow" was shot on January 28, 1986. However, a year later, bassist Strayer had left, leading to a brief hiatus in which they disbanded, until reforming with Gary Quinn on bass leading to the follow-up recording, Obscurity & Flair. Chris Wardman joined soon after the release of Obscurity & Flair as an additional guitarist. Gary Quinn wrote the lyrics for, and played slide guitar on the track "Live Like Fear".

Local and national success
They were invited to open for touring acts such as  The Stranglers at The Concert Hall in April 1983 and Echo and the Bunnymen as well as Let's Active on the Ontario portion of their tour in March 1984.

With the release of Tales of Adventure the band started to receive even more national radio airplay, and the two music videos were getting regular rotation on Canadian television music channel MuchMusic. Breeding Ground made it to the number one spot on the college and university music charts, a first for an independent Canadian act.  In 1989, four years after releasing Tales of Adventure, the band went to the studio for the last time, with the line-up of Shirreff, Gladish, Quinn and Hunter, with a mixture of song-writing including Chris Wardman, before he officially joined the live line-up. Obscurity & Flair produced the hit "Ceremony of Love", once again featuring Johnson. A third video was shot for this song, produced by Mark Mowad, but received minimal exposure on MuchMusic because it was so dark, literally.  Keyboardist Tad Winklarz from Chalk Circle added saxophone on the track "Bells Descend".

Gladish and Shirreff made a decision to end the second phase of the band in March 1990.

Discography
In nine years of existence, Breeding Ground released 2 LPs, 2 EPs, one greatest-hits CD and 3 music videos.

References

Canadian alternative rock groups
Musical groups established in 1981
Musical groups disestablished in 1990
Musical groups from Toronto
1981 establishments in Ontario
1990 disestablishments in Ontario